Horrible Histories is a children's live-action historical and musical sketch-comedy TV series based on the book series of the same name written by Terry Deary. The show ran for five series of thirteen episodes each (plus seven full-length one-off specials), between 2009 and 2013.

Series producer was Caroline Norris. Series 1 was directed by Chloe Thomas and Steve Connelly, with all future series directed by Connelly and Dominic Brigstocke. Writers are listed as per credits of each episode. Original music was—except where noted—written by Richie Webb (music) and Dave Cohen (lyrics), with instrumentals by Webb. The songs were not given formal titles; where possible their creators' names for them have been used.

The starring troop over all five series consisted of Mathew Baynton, Simon Farnaby, Martha Howe-Douglas, Jim Howick, Laurence Rickard, Ben Willbond and Sarah Hadland, some combination of whom appear, with very rare exceptions, in every live-action sketch; their voices can also be heard in the animated sketches. Supporting cast was headed by Alice Lowe, Lawry Lewin and Dominique Moore.

Notable guest stars are indicated in the episode in which they appear, or in the case of recurring roles, on first appearance. Several sketches incorporate parodies of other UK pop-culture media and/or personalities; these parody inspirations are likewise indicated on first appearance.

In 2015, the series returned with a new cast in a revised format. Episodes centred around the life of one prominent historical figure played by an established comedy actor. It was in 2016 that a seventh series began with just three specials before the full series in 2017. The three specials marked anniversaries through the year: 400 years since Shakespeare died, the BBCs 'Love to Read' campaign and 350 years since the Great Fire of London. There was a slight change in cast where the main stars Jalaal Hartley, Tom Stourton and Jessica Ransom continued with new members. This was the first series where none of the main original cast were present.

Overview

Series 1: 2009

Series 2: 2010

Series 3: 2011

Series 4: 2012

Series 5: 2013

Specials

See also 
 List of Horrible Histories (2015 TV series) episodes

References 

Horrible Histories
Horrible Histories
Horrible Histories